William W. Stinson (born 1935) is a former chairman and chief executive officer of Canadian Pacific Railway and former chairman of Sun Life Financial. He was educated at the University of Toronto Schools, Trinity College at the University of Toronto, and the University of Western Ontario. As of 2008, he is the chairman and president of Westshore Terminals. At the time of his promotion to the office of CEO at Canadian Pacific in 1985, after working for the railway since 1955, he was the youngest CEO in the railway's history.

References 

20th-century American railroad executives
Canadian Pacific Railway executives
1935 births
Living people